In Your Bright Ray is the fourth and final solo album, released in 1997, by Grant McLennan.

The album features Brett Myers of Died Pretty and Wayne Connolly of Knievel on guitars, Maurice Argiro of Underground Lovers on bass, and Tim Powles of The Church on drums.

Critical reception
AllMusic wrote: "With a top-notch backing group teasing all the little subtleties that a fan of crafted, gilded, lovely pop could want and McLennan's increasingly wizened, becalmed vocals, the mix of sounds and McLennan's marvelously well-developed material radiates, sparkles, and snaps, crackles, and pops with all his strengths and then some." Trouser Press called the album "pleasant and expertly executed," writing that it "offers little in the way of standouts." CMJ New Music Monthly called the album "McLennan's least immediate offering," writing that "whatever additional concentration is required to appreciate its charms is amply rewarded with a deepened appreciation of his artistry."

Track listing
All words and music by Grant McLennan.

 "In Your Bright Ray" – 4:59
 "Cave In" – 3:34
 "One Plus One" – 2:59
 "Sea Breeze" – 3:49
 "Malibu 69" – 4:46
 "Who Said Love Was Dead" – 3:02
 "Room For Skin" – 3:11
 "All Them Pretty Angels"– 3:32
 "Comet Scar" – 3:38
 "Down Here" – 5:06
 "Lamp By Lamp" – 3:11
 "Do You See the Lights?" – 4:54
 "The Parade of Shadows" – 3:25

Personnel

 Grant McLennan – guitar, vocals
 Brett Myers – guitar, vocals
 Wayne Connolly – guitar, organ, vocals
 Maurice Argiro – bass
 Tim Powles – drums

References

1997 albums
Grant McLennan albums
Beggars Banquet Records albums